Recherche Bay is an oceanic embayment, part of which is listed on the National Heritage Register, located on the extreme south-eastern corner of Tasmania, Australia. It was a landing place of the d’Entrecasteaux expedition to find missing explorer La Pérouse. It is named in honour of the Recherche, one of the expedition's ships. The Nuenonne name for the bay is Leillateah.

French exploration
The explorers set up a camp, made a garden and scientific observatory at Recherche Bay in April 1792 for 26 days, and again in January 1793 for 24 days. Both landings were made to seek refuge and replenish supplies although as much time as possible was dedicated to scientific research. The botanists Jacques Labillardière, Claude Riche and Étienne Pierre Ventenat, assisted by gardener botanist Félix Delahaye, collected and catalogued almost 5000 specimens including the blue gum (Eucalyptus globulus), which later became Tasmania's floral emblem. The expedition also made friendly contact with the Tasmanian Aboriginal people there in 1793.

The scientific observatory at Recherche Bay was the site of the first deliberate scientific experiment on Australian soil. At this observatory, geoscientist Elisabeth Paul Edouard de Rossel conducted a series of measurements that proved geomagnetism varied with latitude.

British settlement
Being isolated from the main areas of early settlement, exposed to westerly gales, and the terrain and soils of a nature that discouraged European agriculture, Recherche Bay saw only moderate activity following the British settlement of Van Diemen's Land.

In 1829, Recherche Bay was the site of the Cyprus mutiny, in which the brig Cyprus was seized by convicts being transported from Hobart Town to Macquarie Harbour Penal Station. The mutineers marooned officers, soldiers, and convicts who did not join the mutiny, without supplies. The mutineers then sailed the Cyprus to Canton, China, where they scuttled her and claimed to be castaways from another vessel. On the way, Cyprus visited Japan during the height of the period of severe Japanese restrictions on the entry of foreigners, the first Australian ship to do so.

During the 1830s and 1840s, the bay was the site of up to five bay whaling stations. it was also a base for pilots guiding ships up the D'Entrecasteaux Channel.  Whaling ships often sheltered there from wild weather, or to try-out whales. Two whalers, the Maria Orr, in 1846, and Offley, in 1880, were wrecked there in gales.  The main commercial activities in the later 19th century and into the early 20th century were timber-gathering, mostly centred on the township of Leprena and coal mining, the latter mostly based around the township of Catamaran.  The Catamaran Coal Company employed the former barque James Craig as a coal hulk there.

Controversy since 2003
In 2003 the private landowners of the D'Entrecasteaux expedition site sought permission to selectively log the area, which was opposed by a large-scale campaign to protect the site from destruction.

In January 2006 the Tasmanian Land Conservancy (TLC) announced plans to raise a minimum of A$1.3 million to purchase the site from its private owners. Dick Smith pledged A$100,000 to the cause, and two weeks later it was announced that over $2 million had been raised to purchase and rehabilitate the site, and that it would be owned by the TLC.

Part of the bay, being the north east peninsula area comprising , was included in the National Heritage List on 7 October 2005.

See also

South Coast Tasmania

References

Further reading

External links
 RechercheBay.org
 Tasmanian Land Conservancy
 Catalyst story on Recherche Bay

Southern Tasmania
Bays of Tasmania
Australian National Heritage List
Whaling stations in Australia
Whaling in Australia